Sarah Wellbrock (née Köhler; born 20 June 1994) is a German swimmer. She represented her country at the 2016 Summer Olympics. In the women's 400 metre freestyle, she finished 10th in the heats and did not qualify for the final. In the women's 800 metre freestyle, she finished in 8th place. She was also a member of the 4 × 200 m freestyle relay team which finished 12th in the heats and did not qualify for the final.

2020 Summer Olympics
Köhler qualified to represent Germany at the 2020 Summer Olympics. In the women's 1500 metre freestyle, she finished 6th in the heats and qualified for the final, winning the bronze medal.

Awards
 SwimSwam Top 100 (Women's): 2022 (#41)

Personal life
In January 2022, Köhler married distance freestyle swimmer Florian Wellbrock of Germany, they got engaged in December 2020.

References

External links

1994 births
Living people
German female swimmers
German female freestyle swimmers
Swimmers at the 2016 Summer Olympics
Swimmers at the 2020 Summer Olympics
Olympic swimmers of Germany
Universiade medalists in swimming
European Aquatics Championships medalists in swimming
Sportspeople from Hanau
Universiade gold medalists for Germany
Universiade silver medalists for Germany
World Aquatics Championships medalists in open water swimming
World Aquatics Championships medalists in swimming
World record holders in swimming
Medalists at the 2017 Summer Universiade
Medalists at the 2020 Summer Olympics
Olympic bronze medalists in swimming
Olympic bronze medalists for Germany
21st-century German women